Jeffrey Alan Schulz (born June 2, 1961 in Evansville, Indiana) is a former Major League Baseball player.

After playing baseball at the University of Southern Indiana, Schulz was selected by the Kansas City Royals in the 23rd round of the 1983 draft.

Schulz's first major league at bat came on September 2, 1989, as a pinch hitter against Nolan Ryan, baseball's all-time strikeout leader. Ryan had notched his five thousandth career strikeout one month earlier, and after the pitcher recorded two quick strikes on Schulz, he idly wondered what number he would be on Ryan's career total. Instead, however, he delivered a single for his first career hit. All in all, he appeared in seven games that year, collecting two hits and one RBI.

Schulz was not initially expected to make the Royals in 1990, but an April injury to Danny Tartabull created a need for another outfielder, and he ended up appearing in 30 games for them that season. He posted a .258 batting average over 66 at bats.

The Royals released Schulz after the end of the season, and he signed with the Pittsburgh Pirates as a free agent. In his final major league action, Schulz made three appearances with the Pirates at midseason. He became a free agent at year's end and signed with the Cincinnati Reds for the 1992 season, but was not called up that year.

Schulz was in camp with the Royals as a replacement player during spring training in 1995. If the 1994 Major League Baseball strike had not been settled before the season was scheduled to begin, he would likely have entered the season as Kansas City's starting right fielder.

References

External links
Schulz's major league statistics at Baseball-Reference.com

1961 births
Kansas City Royals players
Living people
Major League Baseball replacement players
Major League Baseball left fielders
Major League Baseball right fielders
Baseball players from Indiana
Sportspeople from Evansville, Indiana
Pittsburgh Pirates players
Nashville Sounds players
Southern Indiana Screaming Eagles baseball players
American expatriate baseball players in Italy
Buffalo Bisons (minor league) players
Butte Copper Kings players
Charleston Royals players
Fort Myers Royals players
Iowa Cubs players
Memphis Chicks players
Omaha Royals players